"Dead Flowers" is a song recorded by the Rolling Stones. Written by Mick Jagger and Keith Richards, it appears on their 1971 album Sticky Fingers as the fourth track of side two.

Recording and performance history
Recording of "Dead Flowers" took place in April 1970 at the Olympic Studios in London. The lyrics to the song are notably dark, and feature the line, "I'll be in my basement room, with a needle and a spoon", a reference to injecting heroin.

"Dead Flowers" was written during the period when the Stones were stepping into country music territory, when Richards's friendship with Gram Parsons was influencing his songwriting. Jagger commented in 2003:

Both Richards and Mick Taylor contribute the 'honky-tonk' style lead guitar lines throughout the album version. Richards's choppier fills act primarily as a response to Jagger's vocal lines during the verses, while Taylor's more fluid licks counteract with the vocals of the chorus. It is Taylor who performs the guitar solo in place of a third verse.

"Dead Flowers" was performed live during the album tours for Sticky Fingers and Exile on Main St. in 1970–72, then once during the Black and Blue Tour in 1976. It was not played again until the Steel Wheels Tour in 1989. Live performances of the song from 1995 can be found on the Stones' album Stripped and its 2016 edition Totally Stripped.

Cover versions

The song has been widely covered.  Townes Van Zandt included a version of the song on his album of live covers Roadsongs; this version was used in the film The Big Lebowski. Jerry Lee Lewis released a version of the song on his 2010 album, Mean Old Man, which featured Mick Jagger. Willie Nelson performed this song with Keith Richards, Hank Williams III and Ryan Adams on his live album Willie Nelson & Friends – Stars & Guitars.

References

1971 songs
Songs written by Jagger–Richards
The Rolling Stones songs
Jerry Lee Lewis songs
Song recordings produced by Jimmy Miller
Songs about drugs
Country rock songs
Songs about heroin
Songs about flowers